Oenomaus magnus is a species of butterfly of the family Lycaenidae. It is found in lowland forests in French Guiana, Peru, Bolivia and Brazil.

References

Butterflies described in 2008
Eumaeini
Lycaenidae of South America